The James Lynaugh Unit is a state prison for men located in Fort Stockton, Pecos County, Texas, owned by operated by the Texas Department of Criminal Justice. It opened in September 1994, and has a maximum capacity of 1416 male inmates at various security levels.

References

Prisons in Texas
Buildings and structures in Pecos County, Texas
Fort Stockton, Texas
1994 establishments in Texas